Rauhajärvi  a medium-sized lake in the Kymijoki main catchment area. It is located in the region Southern Savonia in Finland. It is situated between two big lakes, Kyyvesi and Puula, and it is a part of Kyyvesi–Puula canoeing route.

See also
List of lakes in Finland

References

Lakes of Kangasniemi
Lakes of Mikkeli